Gearhart Industries, The GO Company (formerly GO Oil Well Services, Gearhart-Owen Industries) was an independent oil well service company founded by Marvin Gearhart and Harrold Owen in 1955 and based in Fort Worth, Texas, United States. It provided well logging and well perforating services to both domestic and international customers. Gearhart was usually supported by national oil companies as a way of containing Schlumberger monopolies.

Early days
Gearhart and Owen had been employees of Welex Jet Services, also located in Fort Worth. Gearhart had been the Chief Logging Engineer while Owen was the Chief Explosives Engineer. It was Welex who had developed the explosive lined shaped charge used for well perforation. As now competitors to Welex, GO was unable to buy perforating charges and in turn developed their own, with a lawsuit by Welex being the result. In 1962, the court's ruling went in favor of GO, but only after the United States Justice Department stepped in and eased the apparent constraint of trade.  Being forced to manufacture their own perforating line was apparently a positive step for GO, as they grew to be the largest supplier of jet charges in the world.  The Perforating Supply Company (PSC) was formed as a subsidiary of GO, and made perforating supplies readily available to other independent wireline companies. Over the next six years, many perforating companies were started, with GO providing both the technical and financial aid.

In 1964, GO bought Electronic Instruments and the company's name was soon changed to Gearhart-Owen Industries (GOI). Later acquisitions included Widco Mandrel Industries, Pengo Manufacturing, Peterson Engineering, and Well Reconnaissance. It was during this period that GO built an ordnance facility at Cleburne, Texas for the manufacture of fuses and warheads for bombs and torpedoes. In July 1973, three explosions at the GO ordnance plant injured 29 people and left three dead.

Throughout the 1950s and 1960s GO was slowly built by selling cased-hole logging and perforating services and equipment also known as completion services. This operation is accomplished by way of a cable containing electrical conductors, called a wireline. The wireline is attached on the bottom end to various tools and sensors and on the upper end to a hoist unit. The hoist units are in turn mounted in trucks for mobility. With this requirement at hand, along with both the sensor tools and perforating supplies, Gearhart manufactured trucks at its Fort Worth facility. Its products were made for both in-house use and for sale to other independents. The company's domestic field operations were handled by its wholly owned subsidiary, GO Wireline from locations throughout the US while the foreign operations fell under GO International, SA.

Hi-tech
By the early 1970s with Harrold Owen going in the direction of explosive manufacturing, Marvin Gearhart had decided that he wanted to crack the lucrative open-hole logging market that was dominated by Schlumberger, Dresser-Atlas, and Welex. In 1972, Gearhart began development of a new series of open hole tools and computer system to analyze the findings. In only 14 months the system was completed and entered its test phase. The new Direct Digital Logging (DDL) system surpassed by leaps and bounds the current analog systems employed by its competition and went into service in 1975 creating large revenues for the company.

Measure While Drilling
During the 1970s while GO was developing other new technologies and breaking into markets, which included Venezuela, Africa, and the North Sea, the domestic oil and gas business was starting to escalate. With a fleet of wireline units that now numbered in the hundreds, Gearhart continued to branch out and had visions of a company that offered a complete package. GO wanted to offer energy producers a line of services that included wireline services, perforating, drilling services, core analysis, seismic services and so on. Fort Worth had now become a research and development center. Gearhart researchers were concentrating on a new technology called Measure While Drilling (MWD). This new product was being developed for market by the same team that had given life to DDL earlier. MWD was what made controlled directional horizontal drilling possible. MWD saved time and money over the traditional methods of wireline logging by eliminating the wireline. After a few years of testing, Gearhart and its Canadian affiliate, Computalog, were gaining advances over their competition.

Sale
For its part, by 1983 Gearhart was enjoying the best growth in the company's history. With operations now stretching not only across North America, but also the Middle East, Africa, East Asia, South America, and the North Sea, Gearhart now commanded international respect. From 1977 to 1981, it had grown from annual revenues of $55 million to $240 million and recording 28 consecutive years of growth. From 1976 to 1979, Gearhart-Owen was the fastest growing company on the New York Stock Exchange.

MWD had now become a process desired by competing companies. By 1983, as an investment, General Electric had bought 25% of Gearhart's stock with rumors of a total buyout of the company. Marvin Gearhart was excited about that possible move, however, it was not to be. Instead, GE informed him that its shares in the company had been sold to Smith International, a competitor to some of Gearhart's divisions. Smith now made a move to buy just enough stock to gain control of the company. Gearhart decided to fight that move, at first through unsuccessful court appeals and later by acquiring the large geophysical company, Geosource. Geosource's size rivaled Gearhart's and the merger indebted Gearhart to the point it was no longer attractive to Smith. Although Gearhart had record revenues of $560 million in 1985, the money-losing habit of Geosource prevented a recovery. When the bottom fell out of the market in 1986, Gearhart had record revenues of over $670 million, employed well over 10,000 people worldwide, and had become the world's third largest wireline logging company. After over 30 years of fulfilling his dream, Marvin Gearhart's company was up for sale.

Late in 1987, its Canadian partner Computalog had signed a letter of intent with Gearhart providing for the possible restructuring and whole acquisition of the company. By February of the following year, it was ready and told the Gearhart management of the plan. On February 24, 1988, it was announced that Gearhart was entering into a buyout agreement with oilfield service giant Halliburton Company. Within Halliburton, it was merged with Welex Jet Services to become Halliburton Logging Services completing the circle which began 33 years earlier. Also, Halliburton later in 1993-94' also acquired the division of Smith International, DataDril, that was to have originally been combined with Gearhart's MWD division.

Pengo
Throughout the 1970s friction began to develop between the two men who had before almost always agreed on everything.  Gearhart did not like selling torpedoes and hand grenade fuses to the military, but there were also other disagreements about the future direction of GO. In 1978, Marvin Gearhart and Harold Owen parted company with Owen taking the non-wireline share of the company, this included PSC and the ordnance facility. This new company that used the name Pengo Industries was also located in Fort Worth and agreed not to compete for three years.

Computalog
By 1976 with his new DDL technology and his lead in innovative open hole solutions, Marvin Gearhart was looking for ways to expand his company and gain a step on industry giant Schlumberger. Open hole was where the money was; it was where drillers decided to go ahead with further production. Gearhart looked to the north and Canada for an answer. The Canadian open hole market was then controlled by just a couple of companies. Gearhart met with several Canadian firms to set up a possible partnership. It was a struggle but Gearhart struck a deal in 1976 with a merger of one of Gearhart's former clients called Perfco and Wireline Electronics. This new partnership would be called Computalog Services and be headquartered in Calgary, Alberta. Perfco and GO were now in the digital wireline open hole business with a domination of the Canadian market ahead of them. For the next several years Computalog, under CEO Walter Dawson, operated basically as an independent company with promising success. It was combined with the cased hole services and the name was changed to Computalog Wireline. The Canadian employees were sent to Fort Worth for training on the new system.

After a couple of years in the planning, it was decided in 1980 to make the company go public with another name change to Computalog Gearhart, Ltd. In spite of unstable business situations due to continued debates in Ottawa over the National Energy Program (NEP), the company made financial strides with revenues of $10 million while Gearhart made $150 million. With the NEP decided by 1981, the Canadian service companies took a beating and many of them fell. Gearhart Computalog took advantage of this and introduced its new MWD technology to Canada. It was met with skepticism but eventually, with acquisition of two drilling companies, Computalog became the leader and had great success.

Computalog was putting every new system that Gearhart could develop to good use. A new data transmittal system called COMSTAR went into service allowing well data to be transmitted by way of satellite from the well to Computalog headquarters for analysis by engineers without having to be on site. By 1985 with acquisitions and new business, Computalog's revenues had almost reached $100 million annually.

In 1986, due to lower prices from non-OPEC producers and political problems in the Middle East, OPEC increased production rates causing a world glut and the resultant drop in prices. The oil service industry again fell on its collective face. Computalog's employees made concessions which proved successful. Gearhart did not fare so well. Computalog was making the most of the technology being supplied by Gearhart and helped shore the Texas parent. In spite of improving conditions in the US, Gearhart was still in financial straits. Gearhart divested itself of many of its holdings leaving it with only a 4.5% ownership of Computalog. It had now lost $337 million and was a prime candidate for buyout. Computalog had now become one of the companies interested. It was not to be and Computalog had now lost its main supply of technology. The Gearhart connection had ended its 12-year run.

Today
Although given a token board position, Marvin Gearhart left the company soon after the Halliburton merger to concentrate on another project, Rockbit Industries, which became Gearhart-Rockbit. In the early 2000s, after the expiration of his non-competition clause with Halliburton, Marvin Gearhart began another new company dedicated to well logging. It is also called Gearhart Industries, and is located across the street from the old facility in Fort Worth, Texas.

References
 The Smartest People Under −The Face− Of The Earth, 1997, Mark Crncich, Computalog

Engineering companies of the United States
Companies based in Fort Worth, Texas